The Chicago Green Sox were a short-lived franchise of the United States Baseball League. The eight-team league ceased operations after just over a month of play in 1912.

1912 Standings 
In the Green Sox and the USBL's only season, Chicago finished 6th place with a 10-12 record.

Notable alumni
Lou Gertenrich (1912)
Ernie Johnson (1912)
Burt Keeley (1912, MGR)
Ed McDonough (1912)
Tom McGuire (1912)
Jim Stanley (1912)

See also
Chicago Green Sox players

References 

 
United States Baseball League teams
1912 establishments in Illinois
1912 disestablishments in Illinois
Baseball teams established in 1912
Baseball teams disestablished in 1912
Defunct baseball teams in Chicago